Ceres were an Australian rock band, formed in 2012 in Melbourne and signed by record label Cooking Vinyl Australia. The band released their debut studio album, I Don't Want To Be Anywhere But Here in 2014 and released a further two studio albums.

History

2012–2015: Early years and I Don't Want To Be Anywhere But Here 
Ceres formed in mid-2012 and recorded and released the EP Luck in February 2013. This garnered them enough interest to secure a spot on the Melbourne leg of the 2014 Soundwave Festival. A couple of months later, in April 2014, the band released their debut studio album, I Don't Want to Be Anywhere But Here which was played on triple j.

2016–2018: Drag it Down on You 
Over the next two years, the band worked on their second studio album. In September 2016, the band's second album, Drag it Down on You, was released.

2019–2020: We Are a Team 
Following three single released, Ceres released We Are a Team in April 2019. It became the band's first charting album, debuting at number 55 on the ARIA Charts. The band became inactive the following year.

Band members
Tom Lanyon – lead vocals, rhythm guitar (2012–2020)
Grant Young – bass (2012–2020)
Frank Morda – drums (2012–2020)
Rhys Vleugel – lead guitar, backing vocals (2012–2016)
Sean Callanan – lead guitar, backing vocals (2016–2020)
Stacey Cicivelli – guitar, keyboards, backing vocals (2019–2020)

Discography

Albums

EPs

Singles

Awards and nominations

J Award
The J Awards are an annual series of Australian music awards that were established by the Australian Broadcasting Corporation's youth-focused radio station Triple J. They commenced in 2005.

|-
| J Awards of 2014
| themselves
| Unearthed Artist of the Year
|

Music Victoria Awards
The Music Victoria Awards (previously known as The Age EG Awards and The Age Music Victoria Awards) are an annual awards night celebrating Victorian music.

! 
|-
| Music Victoria Awards of 2014
| I Don't Want to Be Anywhere But Here
| Best Heavy Album
| 
| 
|-

National Live Music Awards
The National Live Music Awards (NLMAs) are a broad recognition of Australia's diverse live industry, celebrating the success of the Australian live scene. The awards commenced in 2016.

|-
| National Live Music Awards of 2020
| Ceres
| Victorian Live Act of the Year
| 
|-

References

Australian indie pop groups
Musical groups from Melbourne
Musical groups established in 2012
Australian indie rock groups
2012 establishments in Australia